Kelis Johana Peduzine Vargas (born 21 April 1983) is a Colombian retired football defender who played for the Colombia women's national football team. She competed at the 2011 FIFA Women's World Cup and the 2012 Summer Olympics. At the club level, she played for CD Eba.

See also
 Colombia at the 2012 Summer Olympics

References

External links
 
 
 

1983 births
Living people
Place of birth missing (living people)
Colombian women's footballers
Women's association football defenders
Colombia women's international footballers
2011 FIFA Women's World Cup players
Olympic footballers of Colombia
Footballers at the 2012 Summer Olympics
21st-century Colombian women